Gordon Brown served as Chancellor of the Exchequer of the United Kingdom from on 2 May 1997 to 27 June 2007. His time as chancellor was marked by major reform of Britain's monetary and fiscal policy architecture, transferring interest rate setting powers to the Bank of England, by a wide extension of the powers of the Treasury to cover much domestic policy and by transferring responsibility for banking supervision to the Financial Services Authority. Brown presided over the longest period of sustained economic growth in British history.

Brown was appointed chancellor by Prime Minister Tony Blair after Labour's victory in the 1997 general election, its largest landslide general election victory in history, and served in the role throughout Blair's premiership. One of Brown's first acts as chancellor was to grant the Bank of England the freedom to set the UK's interest rate, a decision that had previously been the responsibility of the chancellor. Brown was reappointed chancellor following Labour's landslide victory in the 2001 general election, and won a third term after the party also won the 2005 general election, though with a vastly reduced majority.

During his chancellorship, Brown outlined five economic tests, which resisted the UK adopting the euro currency. Controversial moves included the abolition of advance corporation tax (ACT) relief in his first budget, the sale of UK gold reserves from 1999 to 2002, and the removal in his final budget of the 10% starting rate of personal income tax which he had introduced in 1999. In 2007, Brown was succeeded as chancellor by Alistair Darling the day after Brown succeeded Blair as Labour Party leader and prime minister, following Blair's resignation.

Major acts as Chancellor
After Labour's victory in the 1997 general election, its largest landslide general election victory in history, Prime Minister Tony Blair appointed Gordon Brown as Chancellor of the Exchequer. He had previously been the Shadow Chancellor during Blair's tenure as Leader of the Opposition under Conservative Prime Minister John Major.

Bank of England 
On taking office as Chancellor, Brown gave the Bank of England operational independence in monetary policy, and thus responsibility for setting interest rates. At the same time, he stripped the Bank of England of its regulatory powers, giving them to the newly created Financial Services Authority, whose board is appointed by the Treasury.

Taxation and spending 
Brown adhered to Labour's 1997 election manifesto pledge not to increase the basic or higher rates of income tax. He reduced the starting rate from 20% (pre-1997) to 10% in 1999, before abolishing the starting rate in 2007; a decision that led to an immense backbench revolt, and reduced the basic rate from 23% (pre-1997) to 22% (2000) and then 20% (2007).

Brown increased the tax thresholds in line with inflation, rather than earnings, which rise more quickly during periods of economic growth. This results in fiscal drag in which more taxpayers are drawn into the upper rates (e.g. in 2000–01 there were 2,880,000 higher-rate taxpayers, whereas in 2005–06 there were 3,160,000).

In 1997, Brown also introduced taxation of pension funds. Documents subsequently released under the Freedom of Information Act showed that civil servants warned at the time that the move, which generated £5,000,000,000 in tax revenue, could lead to the closure of many occupational schemes, which subsequently came to pass. In 2008, a biographer of Brown, Tom Bower, claimed that Brown had originally sought a larger sum from pension funds, but backed down in the face of opposition.

In contrast, corporation tax fell under Brown, from a main rate of 33% (pre-1997) to 30% (1999) and then 28% (2007), and from 24% to 19% for small businesses (although the lower rate was set to rise to 22% by 2010).

Under Brown, telecom radio frequency auctions gathered £22,500,000,000 for the government. By using a system of sealed bids and only selling a restricted number of licences, they extracted high prices from the telecom operators. Germany at this time applied a similar auction; some allege that these together caused a severe recession in the European telecoms development industry (2001 Telecoms crash) with the loss of 100,000 jobs across Europe, 30,000 of those in the UK. But, as Paul Klemperer, one of the designers of the auctions, points out, "[t]he United States held no 3G auctions, yet telecoms companies lost just as much: in fact, they lost more."

Once the two-year period of following the Conservative's spending plans was over, Brown's 2000 Spending Review outlined a major expansion of government spending, particularly on healthcare and education. In his April 2002 budget, Brown raised National Insurance to pay for increased health spending. Brown also changed tax policy in other ways, such as the introduction of working tax credits. This is one of several ideas borrowed from the US Clinton administration whereby welfare payments are accounted for as negative taxation. The separate means-testing process for tax credits has been criticised by some as bureaucratic, and in 2003–04 and 2004–05 problems in the system led to overpayments of £2,200,000,000 and £1,800,000,000 respectively. However, economic theory suggests tax credits can strengthen work incentives for those at the margin between employment and unemployment, and the IFS has estimated the reforms brought at least 50,000 single mothers into part-time work.

The Centre for Policy Studies found the poorest fifth of households, which accounted for 6.8% of all taxes in 1996–7, accounted for 6.9% of all taxes paid in 2004–5. Meanwhile, their share of state benefit payouts dropped from 28.1% to 27.1% over the same period.

According to the OECD UK taxation had increased from a 39.3% share of GDP in 1997 to 42.4% in 2006, going to a higher level than Germany. This increase has mainly been attributed to active government policy, and not simply to the growing economy. To have brought this about with only one explicit tax rise has led to accusations of Brown imposing stealth taxes. A commonly reported example resulted in 1997 from a technical change in the way corporation tax is collected, the indirect effect of which was for the dividends on equity investments held within pensions to be taxed, thus lowering pension returns and allegedly contributing to the demise of some pension funds. The Treasury contend that this tax change was crucial to long-term economic growth: the existing corporation tax system created biased incentives for corporations to pay out profits as dividends to shareholders (including pension funds, who could then reclaim the tax paid) rather than to reinvest them into company growth (which would result in corporation tax being paid). The old system of corporation tax was widely viewed by economists as a constraint on British economic growth.

Growth development and employment 

Brown pointed to two main accomplishments: growth and employment. An OECD report shows UK economic growth averaged 2.7% between 1997 and 2006, higher than the Eurozone's 2.1%, though lower than in any other English-speaking country. UK unemployment is 5.5%, down from 7% in 1997 and lower than the Eurozone's average of 8.1%.

In October 1997, Brown took control of the United Kingdom's membership of the European single currency issue by announcing the Treasury would set five economic tests to ascertain whether the economic case had been made. In June 2003, the Treasury indicated the tests had not been passed.

Between 1999 and 2002, Brown sold 60% of UK gold reserves at $275 an ounce. It was later attacked as a "disastrous foray into international asset management" as he had sold at close to a 20-year low. The UK eventually sold about 395 tons of gold over 17 auctions from July 1999 to March 2002, at an average price of about US$275 per ounce, raising approximately US$3,500,000,000. By 2011, that quantity of gold would be worth over $19,000,000,000. He pressured the IMF to do the same, but it resisted.Brown believes it is appropriate to remove much of the unpayable Third World debt but does not think all debt should be wiped out.

When Labour was re-elected for a third consecutive term at the 2005 general election (though with a vastly reduced majority following the landslide victories at the previous two elections), many MPs spoke of the Labour election victory as being Brown's achievement rather than Blair's; while Blair was facing criticism as Prime Minister for leading the UK into Afghanistan and Iraq, Brown was receiving credit for helping secure a strong economy for Britain.

On 20 April 2006, in a speech to the United Nations Ambassadors, Brown outlined a "Green" view of global development:

Other statements and events

Higher education 
In 2000, Brown started a major political row about higher education (referred to as the Laura Spence Affair) when he accused the University of Oxford of elitism in its admissions procedures. He described the University's decision not to offer a place to state school pupil Laura Spence as "absolutely outrageous" and implied its decision was based on her background rather than her academic potential. This started a major and hotly argued row in the media in which Oxford strongly denied these accusations. With his comments, Brown can arguably be credited with raising widening participation to higher education up the political agenda. However, many of his opponents said Brown's comments were ill-founded; including Lord Jenkins (then Chancellor of the University of Oxford) who said "nearly every fact he used was false," and that Brown's speech had been a "little Blitzkrieg in being an act of sudden unprovoked aggression".

Anti-racism and popular culture 
During a diplomatic visit to India in January 2007, Brown responded to questions concerning perceived racism and bullying against Bollywood actress Shilpa Shetty on the UK reality TV programme Celebrity Big Brother saying, "There is a lot of support for Shilpa. It is pretty clear we are getting the message across. Britain is a nation of tolerance and fairness." He later said the debate showed Britain wanted to be "defined by being a tolerant, fair and decent country."

Budgets 
Brown delivered eleven budgets during his chancellorship; 1997, 1998, 1999, 2000, 2001, 2002, 2003, 2004, 2005, and 2006.

1997 

In his budget speech, which he described as a "people's budget", Brown told the House of Commons the government was spending more on debt than education, and set a five year target to reduce the public deficit, while also announcing that the government would only borrow to invest and public debt would be held at a "prudent and stable level over the economic cycle". He set the underlying public sector borrowing requirement at £13.25bn for 1997–98, and £5.5bn for 1998–99. It was forecast that GDP would rise by 3.25% in 1997 and 2.5% in 1998, and consumer spending would increase by 4.5% in 1997 and 4% in 1998. Economic growth was forecast to be 2.5% for 1998, while inflation would rise by 2.5% in 1997, 2.75% in 1998, and 2.5% in 1999.

1998 

Titled New Ambitions for Britain, and with "prudence as a purpose" as its narrative, Brown's 1998 budget sought to strike a careful balance between maintaining Labour's broad appeal among the Middle England demographic who had voted for the party the previous year, thus helping Tony Blair to become prime minister, while offering help to those on low incomes. His statement set out to achieve four objectives—stability, enterprise, welfare reform and strong public services. He told the House of Commons: "For decades, under Governments of both parties, the great economic strengths of our country have been undermined by deep-seated structural weaknesses—instability, under-investment, unemployment." He hoped to address this with a long-term plan for economic growth and success.

He reported that the five-year plan to reduce the UK's deficit announced in his 1997 budget was being achieved at a faster rate than had been forecast, with the UK national debt having come down by £17bn, or 2% of national income, since July 1997. He expressed a need for caution, and said that he would "lock in this fiscal tightening" for 1998–99. As a consequence, borrowing, which the previous government had planned to be £19bn for 1998, was now forecast to be £5bn for 1998, a little under £4bn for 1999, and was expected to be in balance by 2000. On economic growth, Brown said it was dependent on "what happens to wage inflation over the coming year. It would be the worst of short-termism to pay ourselves more today at the cost of higher interest rates, fewer jobs and slower growth tomorrow. All of us must therefore show greater responsibility." He suggested wage inflation would slow growth from 2.5% to 2% in 1998, and similarly predicted percentage figures of between one and three quarters and two and a quarter for 1999, and between two and a quarter and two and three quarters for 2000."

1999 

The budget took place during a period of continuing economic expansion, shortly after the launch of the Euro currency on 1 January 1999, and at the tail end of the dot-com bubble. During 1998, net public sector debt stood at £361.2 billion, 35.6 per cent of GDP. Interest rates had declined rapidly over the previous twelve months from a peak of 7.5 per cent in June 1998 to 5.5 per cent by February 1999, whilst inflation during 1998 was recorded at 1.6 per cent (CPI) and 3.4 per cent (RPI).

A new starting rate of income tax at 10 per cent was to be introduced in April 1999. Basic rate income tax was to be reduced from 23 per cent to 22 per cent in April 2000. The budget also abolished the married couple's allowance for under-65s and MIRAS mortgage interest relief from April 2000. Child tax credit was to be introduced and employer national insurance contributions cut by 0.5 per cent from April 2001. Stamp duties on property were to be raised. A Climate Change Levy was scheduled for the 2001-02 fiscal year.

2000 

The millennium year witnessed Britain's major trading partners, particularly the US and several European economies, enter economic difficulties as part of the early 2000s recession. The dot-com bubble burst, though fallout in the United Kingdom was limited. During the autumn, UK fuel protests occurred due to rising petrol prices.During 1999, net public sector debt stood at £364.4 billion, 34.3 per cent of GDP. Interest rates had showed greater stability in comparison to the previous year, rising from 5 per cent in June 1999 to 6 per cent in February 2000 where it remained for the rest of the year. Inflation abated further during 1999 which recorded 1.3 per cent (CPI) and 1.5 per cent (RPI).

The basic rate of income tax was to be reduced from 23 per cent to 22 per cent from April 2000. The married couple's allowance for under-65s and MIRAS mortgage interest relief was to be abolished from April 2000. Fuel duty was to be frozen in real terms. Excise duties on cigarettes were to increase by 5 per cent above inflation. Stamp duties were to be raised. Tax credits and income support were scheduled to be increased. Large increases in NHS spending were forecast. The Climate Change Levy was to be reduced before its introduction in April 2001, with the concomitant cut in employer national insurance contributions instead limited to 0.3 per cent instead of 0.5 per cent.

2001

2002 

The most significant policy implemented as part of this Budget was the 1% National Insurance increase on both employees and employers, the proceeds of which went towards an increase in NHS spending.

2003

2004

2005

2006

Post-chancellorship career in politics 
In October 2004, Tony Blair announced he would not lead the party into a fourth general election, but would serve a full third term. Political comment over the relationship between Brown and Blair continued up to and beyond the 2005 election, which Labour won with a reduced majority and reduced vote share.

Blair announced on 7 September 2006 that he would step down within a year. Brown was the clear favourite to succeed Blair; he was the only candidate spoken of seriously in Westminster. Appearances and news coverage leading up to the handover were interpreted as preparing the ground for Brown to become Prime Minister, in part by creating the impression of a statesman with a vision for leadership and global change. This enabled Brown to signal the most significant priorities for his agenda as Prime Minister; speaking at a Fabian Society conference on 'The Next Decade' in January 2007, he stressed education, international development, narrowing inequalities (to pursue 'equality of opportunity and fairness of outcome'), renewing Britishness, restoring trust in politics, and winning hearts and minds in the war on terror as key priorities.

Blair said that he expected Brown to succeed him, and that Brown "would make an excellent Prime Minister". When nominations for the leadership elections opened, Blair was one of those nominating Brown. The election process concluded with Brown being declared leader at a special conference on 24 June 2007. On 27 June, Blair resigned as Prime Minister of the United Kingdom and was succeeded by Brown. He was succeeded as Chancellor by Alistair Darling the day Brown became Prime Minister.

Brown became the Prime Minister of the United Kingdom on 27 June 2007. He was succeeded by Alistair Darling as Chancellor the following day

Prime Minister of the United Kingdom (2007-2010) 

Under Brown, the party continued to use the campaign label New Labour, though Brown's style of government differed to that of Blair. Brown's government introduced rescue packages in 2008 and 2009 to help keep the banks afloat during the global financial crisis, and as a result the national debt increased dramatically. The government took majority shareholdings in Northern Rock and Royal Bank of Scotland, both of which experienced severe financial difficulties, and injected large amounts of public money into several other banks, including Lloyds Banking Group, which formed through the acquisition of HBOS by Lloyds TSB in 2009. In 2008, Brown's government passed the world's first Climate Change Act, and introduced the Equality Act 2010.

Despite initial rises in opinion polls after Brown became prime minister, Labour's popularity declined with the onset of the Great Recession, leading to poor results in the local and European elections in 2009. In the 2010 general election, Labour lost 91 seats, the party's biggest loss of seats in a single general election since 1931, resulting in a hung parliament in which the Conservative Party won the most seats. Brown remained prime minister while the Liberal Democrats entered separate negotiations with Labour and the Conservatives with a view to forming a coalition government. After the Conservatives formed a coalition government with the Liberal Democrats, Brown was succeeded as prime minister by Conservative leader David Cameron, and as Labour Party leader by Ed Miliband.

Post-premiership 
After leaving office, Brown returned to the backbenches, continuing to serve as the MP for Kirkcaldy and Cowdenbeath until he gave up his seat in 2015, has since made occasional political interventions, and has also published several political themed books. Brown played a prominent role in the campaign to maintain the union between Scotland and the United Kingdom during the 2014 Scottish independence referendum, and in 2022 unveiled a Labour Party blueprint with incumbent Labour leader Keir Starmer for the future, proposing the biggest ever transfer of political power out of Westminster and into the towns, cities, and nations of the UK. Since stepping down as an MP, Brown has served as the United Nations Special Envoy for Global Education and the WHO Ambassador for Global Health Financing.

Records
Brown's ten years and two months as Chancellor of the Exchequer set several records. He was the longest-serving Labour Party Chancellor of the Exchequer ever, beating Denis Healey, who was Chancellor for 5 years and 2 months from 5 March 1974 to 4 May 1979.

On 15 June 2004, he became the longest continuous serving Chancellor since the Reform Act 1832, passing the figure of 7 years and 43 days set by David Lloyd George (1908–1915). However, William Ewart Gladstone was Chancellor for a total of 12 years and 4 months in the period from 1852 to 1882 (although not continuously).

Brown stated his chancellorship had seen the longest period of sustained economic growth in UK history, although part of this growth period started under the preceding Conservative government in 1993, and the details in Brown's growth figures have been challenged, as have his more general claims to have created the conditions for prosperity and declining poverty levels.

Public image 
Brown was the longest-serving Labour Party chancellor, and his tenure as chancellor was the second-longest continuous period of office of any chancellor, surpassed only by Nicholas Vansittart two centuries before. Brown had high approval ratings and was viewed as a successful and popular chancellor. He was also rated as the most successful chancellor in terms of providing economic stability, working independently from the prime minister and leaving a lasting legacy on Britain's economy.

Notes

References

1990s in the United Kingdom
Brown, Gordon
Gordon Brown
2000s in the United Kingdom
Early lives of the prime ministers of the United Kingdom